Lulu Wang may refer to:

 Lulu Wang (filmmaker), Chinese-American filmmaker
 Lulu Wang (novelist) (born 1960), Chinese-Dutch novelist